Hone Wetere Te Rerenga (? – 9 March 1889) was a notable New Zealand Māori tribal leader. He identified with the Ngāti Maniapoto iwi. He was born in Maniaroa or Rangitoto, in the King Country, New Zealand.

Of eight candidates, he came fourth with 9.99% of the vote.

References

1889 deaths
Ngāti Maniapoto people
People from Waikato
Year of birth missing
Unsuccessful candidates in the 1884 New Zealand general election